Adelaide Soler was an Argentine film, stage, radio, television and theater actress during the golden age of Argentina cinema. She was born in Buenos Aires and died there in 1976.

Filmography
 1937: Melodías porteñas
 1939: Giácomo
 1939: Ambición
 1940: De México llegó el amor
 1954: El Calavera
 1954: Un Hombre cualquiera
 1958: La venenosa
 1971: El caradura y la millonaria

References

External links
 

1976 deaths
Actresses from Buenos Aires
Argentine film actresses
Argentine stage actresses
Argentine television actresses
Year of birth missing